USS Raven III (SP-103), later USS SP-103, was an armed motorboat that served in the United States Navy as a patrol vessel from 1917 to 1919.
 
Raven III was built as a civilian motorboat in 1916 at by the Purdy Boat Company at Miami, Florida. The U.S. Navy purchased her from Purdy on 14 June 1917 for use as a patrol boat during World War I. Purdy delivered Raven III to the Navy on 28 June 1917, and she was commissioned on 5 October 1917 at Key West, Florida, as USS Raven III (SP-103).

Soon after commissioning, Raven III was renamed USS SP-103 and attached to Section 4 of the 7th Naval Districts coast defense force as a patrol craft working with the training facility at Key West.

SP-103 sank accidentally on 12 September 1919. She was raised and later sold to Stewart McDonald of the Moon Motor Car Company of St. Louis, Missouri.

References

NavSource Online: Section Patrol Craft Photo Archive: SP-103 ex-Raven III (SP 103)

Patrol vessels of the United States Navy
World War I patrol vessels of the United States
Ships built in Miami
1916 ships